George J. Fisher (died 1960) was a physician and leader in the fields of youth development and physical fitness in the United States during the early twentieth century. He was a noted advocate for advancing the sport of volleyball.

Volleyball and the YMCA

Fisher was president of the international YMCA's Physical Directors Society from 1904 to 1919. Fisher is best remembered for making volleyball a part of the program in military training camps, both in the United States and abroad while serving as Secretary of the YMCA War Work Office

With the beginning of World War I, volleyball spread worldwide. Fisher included volleyball in the recreation and education program for American armed forces as early as 1914 and American soldiers fighting in World War I played volleyball on the beaches of Normandy and Brittany. In 1919  Fisher made volleyball a part of the program in military training camps, both in the United States and abroad. He was the editor of the Volleyball Rules Guide for the Army and Navy.

Boy Scouts of America
Fisher served as deputy Chief Scout Executive of the Boy Scouts of America from 1919 to 1943, and as National Commissioner from 1943 until his death in 1960.

United States Volleyball Association
Fisher was the founder and first president (1928–1952) of the United States Volleyball Association. He also served as the first editor of the Volleyball Guide from 1917 to 1947.  The Leader in Volleyball Award was renamed to the George J. Fisher Leader in Volleyball Award in his honor.

References

External links 
Fisher

National Commissioners of the Boy Scouts of America
American volleyball administrators
1960 deaths
1871 births
YMCA leaders